is a passenger railway station  located in the city of Sanda, Hyōgo Prefecture, Japan. It is operated by the private transportation company, Kobe Electric Railway (Shintetsu).

Lines
It is also the terminus of the 5.5 kilometer Shintetsu Kōen-Toshi Line to

Station layout
The station consists of one island platform serving two tracks, located in a cutting, and connected to the station building by footbridges.The Sanda side from this station is a double track shared by the Sanda Line and the Kōen-Toshi Line, but on the Shinkaichi/Woody Town central side, two single tracks run in different directions.  The track extending from this station to the Shinkaichi side draws a sharp curve, so trains arriving and departing from the Shinkaichi side slow down. The trains on the Kōen-Toshi Line go into a tunnel as soon as they leave the station, but since the track is connected to Platform 1 in a straight line, trains bound for Sanda from the Kōen-Toshi Line often enter the line without slowing down. A connecting line is also installed on the Sanda side so that trains from the Sanda direction can turn back.

Platforms

History
On 18 December 1928, in tandem with the opening of the Sanda Line,  was opened. It was renamed to Yokoyama in 1990.

The line was double-tracked between Yokoyama and Sanda in March 1991, and the Kōen-Toshi Line between Yokoyama and Flower Town opened in October of the same year.

Passenger statistics
In fiscal 2019, the station was used by an average of 3,708 passengers daily

Surrounding area
Japan National Route 276 
Sanda Gakuen Junior and Senior High School
Hyogo Prefectural Hokusetsu Sanda High School

See also
List of railway stations in Japan

References

External links 

 Official home page 

Railway stations in Hyōgo Prefecture
Railway stations in Japan opened in 1928
Sanda, Hyōgo